Manistee Catholic Central School is a private, Roman Catholic school in Manistee, Michigan.  It is operated by the Roman Catholic Diocese of Gaylord.

History
Manistee Catholic Central Schools was established in 1964 through the consolidation of several local parish schools.

Sports 
Catholic Central has a variety of sports including football, volleyball, cheerleading, basketball, softball, track and field, bowling and golf, co-op ski.

External links
http://www.sabers.org

Notes and references

Roman Catholic Diocese of Gaylord
Catholic secondary schools in Michigan
Schools in Manistee County, Michigan
Educational institutions established in 1964
Private middle schools in Michigan
Private elementary schools in Michigan
1964 establishments in Michigan